Carrie Fountain is an American poet and writer of young adult fiction. She served as 2019 Poet Laureate of Texas.

She is from Las Cruces, New Mexico.
She was a fellow at the Michener Center for Writers, and received Swink Magazine'''s Award for Emerging Writers and the Marlboro Poetry Prize. 
She wrote for The Texas Observer,
and was poetry columnist for the Austin American-Statesman.

Her work has appeared in Cimarron Review, Black Warrior Review, 32 Poems, and Missouri Review Online. 
She lives in Austin, Texas and teaches at St. Edward's University .

She was named the 2019 Poet Laureate of Texas.

She is married to the playwright Kirk Lynn.

Awards
2009 National Poetry Series, for Burn LakeWorks
"Purple Heart", Marlboro Review"Burn Lake 2", Swink, 2007
"Father and Son at the Mesilla Valley Drive-thru Bank", AGNI"Theory of Perfection", AGNI"El Camino Real 3 ", Poetry for Children "Will You"Burn Lake. Penguin Group USA, 2010, Instant Winner: Poems. Penguin Group USA, 2014, I'm Not Missing: A Novel.'' Flatiron Books, New York, 2018,

References

External links

"Carrie Fountain’s, Burn Lake", September 19, 2009

Year of birth missing (living people)
People from Las Cruces, New Mexico
Living people
American women poets
American young adult novelists
21st-century American women
Women writers of young adult literature